"Cheek to Cheek" is a song written by Irving Berlin in 1934–35, specifically for the star of his new musical, Fred Astaire. The movie was Top Hat, co-starring Ginger Rogers. In the movie, Astaire sings the song to Rogers as they dance. The song was nominated for the Best Song Oscar for 1936, which it lost to "Lullaby of Broadway". The song spent five weeks at #1 on Your Hit Parade and was named the #1 song of 1935. Astaire's 1935 recording with the Leo Reisman Orchestra was inducted into the Grammy Hall of Fame in 2000. In 2004, Astaire's version finished at No. 15 on AFI's 100 Years...100 Songs survey of top tunes in American cinema.

Release
On June 26, 1935, Fred and Leo Reisman, along with his Orchestra, got to work at ARC (parent company of Brunswick Records at the time) Studios in New York City. They recorded two Irving Berlin compositions, "Cheek To Cheek" and "No Strings (I'm Fancy Free)". The next day, with Johnny Greene's Orchestra, "Isn't This a Lovely Day?" and "Top Hat, White Tie and Tails" were completed. Both singles were released in August, and then at the end of the month, "Top Hat" premiered. The timing must have been perfect, because "Cheek to Cheek" headed straight to #1, where it stayed for eleven weeks, and finished the #1 hit of 1935. Fred topped his career high of ten weeks for "Night And Day".

Recorded versions
According to the database of secondhandsongs.com, "Cheek to Cheek" has been recorded by 438 different artists as of July 2021.

References

1935 songs
1935 singles
Al Jolson songs
Billie Holiday songs
Bing Crosby songs
Doris Day songs
Ella Fitzgerald songs
Eva Cassidy songs
Frank Sinatra songs
Fred Astaire songs
Grammy Hall of Fame Award recipients
Lady Gaga songs
Louis Armstrong songs
Peggy Lee songs
Rod Stewart songs
Sammy Davis Jr. songs
Songs about dancing
Songs written for films
Songs written by Irving Berlin
Tony Bennett songs